Ohio's 14th senatorial district has historically stretched across the Ohio River east of Cincinnati in southern Ohio.  Currently it encompasses the counties of Clermont, Brown, Adams, Scioto and portions of Lawrence County. It encompasses Ohio House districts 65, 66 and 90. It has a Cook PVI of R+10.  The district is the only to be represented by two different Senate Presidents, Doug White (2003-2004) and Tom Niehaus (2011-2012).  Its current Ohio Senator is Republican Terry Johnson.  He resides in McDermott, a census-designated place (CPD) located in Scioto.

List of senators

References

External links
Ohio's 14th district senator at the 130th Ohio General Assembly official website

Ohio State Senate districts